S-formylglutathione hydrolase is an enzyme that in humans is encoded by the ESD gene.

References

Further reading

External links 
 

Genes on human chromosome 13